William Batchelder Bradbury (October 6, 1816 – January 7, 1868) was a musician who composed the tune to "Jesus Loves Me" and many other popular hymns.

Biography
He was born on October 6, 1816, in York, Maine, where his father was the leader of a church choir. He had a brother, Edward G. Bradbury.

He moved with his parents to Boston and met Lowell Mason, and by 1834 was known as an organist. In 1840, he began teaching in Brooklyn, New York. In 1847 he went to Germany, where he studied harmony, composition, and vocal and instrumental music with the best masters.

In 1854, he started the Bradbury Piano Company, with his brother, Edward G. Bradbury in New York City. William Bradbury is best known as a composer and publisher of a series of musical collections for choirs and schools. He was the author and compiler of fifty-nine books starting in 1841.

In 1862, Bradbury found the poem "Jesus Loves Me". Bradbury wrote the music and added the chorus: "Yes, Jesus loves me, Yes, Jesus Loves me ..."

He died on January 7, 1868, in Bloomfield, New Jersey (now Montclair, New Jersey) at age 51. He was buried in Bloomfield Cemetery in Bloomfield, New Jersey.

Works
He composed many tunes, including those for "He Leadeth Me"; "Just As I Am"; "Sweet Hour of Prayer" (attributed to William W. Walford, 1772–1850); "Savior, Like a Shepherd Lead Us" and "My Hope Is Built on Nothing Less", all of which can still be found in hynmbooks and songbooks today.

Publications
The Shawm (1853)
The Jubilee (1858)
Cottage Melodies (1859)
The Golden Chain (1861)
"Hold On Abraham!" (1862)
The Key-Note and Pilgrims' Songs (1863)
The Golden Censer (1864)
Golden Trio (1864)
Temple Choir and Fresh Laurels (1867)
Clairiona (1867) compilation of previous works

References

External links

 
 Free scores Mutopia Project
 More scores and biographical information at Hymnary.org
 

1816 births
1868 deaths
American male composers
People from Montclair, New Jersey
19th-century American composers
Musicians from New Jersey
People from York, Maine
Musicians from Maine
American hymnwriters
19th-century American male musicians